Abul-Hasan al-Muhajir (died 27 October 2019) was the kunya used by the official spokesman of the Islamic State of Iraq and the Levant from 5 December 2016 until 27 October 2019, when he was killed in a U.S. airstrike in northwest Syria. He was a Saudi national.

History
Abul-Hasan was the successor of Abu Mohammad al-Adnani, who was killed while visiting the Aleppo frontlines in Syria in August 2016. He was believed to have been a foreigner due to his kunya identifying him as "al-Muhajir" meaning "the emigrant". After his death, he was confirmed to be a Saudi national on 31 October.

Speeches
 "And You Will Remember What I [Now] Say To You" – 5 December 2016
 "So Be Patient. Indeed, The Promise Of God Is Truth" – 4 April 2017
 "And When The Believers Saw The Companies" – 12 June 2017
 "So From Their Guidance Take An Example" – 22 April 2018
 "The Mujāhidīn’s Assault on the Tower of the Polytheists" – 26 September 2018
 "He Was True To God, So [God] Was True To Him" – 18 March 2019

Speculation about identity
In an article published in The Atlantic, journalist Graeme Wood postulates that Abul-Hasan al-Muhajir is Texas-born John Georgelas, also known as Yahya Abu Hassan, though he later cast doubt on his theory, and al-Bahrumi was eventually killed in October 2017. Italian media has also speculated that al-Muhajir studied at the Black Swan Rock School of Music in Luserna San Giovanni.

Death
Muhajir and four others were killed on 27 October 2019 by a Central Intelligence Agency airstrike in Ayn al-Bayda, near Jarablus in northwest Syria, close to the border with Turkey. It came less than 24 hours after ISIS leader Abu Bakr al-Baghdadi blew himself up during a U.S. raid in Syria's Idlib Province. Muhajir was described as a senior ISIS leader and Baghdadi's "right-hand man."

On 29 October, U.S. President Donald Trump stated on social media that al-Baghdadi's "number one replacement" had been killed by American forces, adding: "Most likely would have taken the top spot - Now he is also Dead!" While Trump did not specify a name, a U.S. official later confirmed that Trump was referring to al-Muhajir. On 31 October, ISIS confirmed al-Muhajir and al-Baghdadi's deaths.

References

2019 deaths
Assassinated ISIL members
Year of birth missing
Deaths by American airstrikes during the Syrian civil war
Saudi Arabian Islamists
Place of birth missing